The Forty-first Oklahoma Legislature was a meeting of the legislative branch of the government of Oklahoma, composed of the Senate and the House of Representatives. It met in Oklahoma City from January 6, 1987, to January 3, 1989, during the term of Governor Henry Bellmon.

The 41st Oklahoma Legislature merged the last remaining community junior college, Sayre Junior College, with Southwestern Oklahoma State University.

Rodger Randle served as President pro tempore of the Oklahoma Senate. Jim Barker served as Speaker of the Oklahoma House of Representatives.

Dates of sessions
First regular session: January 6, 1987-May 1987
Second regular session: January–May 1988
Previous: 40th Legislature • Next: 42nd Legislature

Party composition

Senate

House of Representatives

Leadership

Democratic leadership
President Pro Tempore: Rodger Randle
Speaker: Jim Barker

Republican leadership
House Minority Leader: Walter Hill

Members

Senate

Table based on state almanac.

House of Representatives

Table based on government database of historic members.

References and notes

Oklahoma legislative sessions
1987 in Oklahoma
1988 in Oklahoma
1987 U.S. legislative sessions
1988 U.S. legislative sessions